Roy Smith (20 January 1910 – 19 October 1971) was an English cricketer.  Smith was a right-handed batsman.  He was born at Stoke-on-Trent, Staffordshire.

Smith made his debut for Staffordshire in the 1931 Minor Counties Championship against Durham.  Smith played Minor counties cricket for Staffordshire from 1931 to 1954 (excluding the six seasons in which there was no county cricket due to World War II), making 98 appearances.  In 1949, he made a single first-class appearance for a combined Minor Counties team against Yorkshire at Lord's.  In the Minor Counties first-innings, he was dismissed for 29 runs by Allan Mason, while in their second-innings he was dismissed for a duck by Fred Trueman.  Yorkshire won the match by 136 runs.

He died at Great Chell, Staffordshire on 19 October 1971.  He had a brother and nephew who both played for Staffordshire.

References

External links
Roy Smith at ESPNcricinfo
Roy Smith at CricketArchive

1910 births
1971 deaths
Cricketers from Stoke-on-Trent
English cricketers
Staffordshire cricketers
Minor Counties cricketers